Ōshiro (Oshiro or Ooshiro) is the transliteration of several Japanese and Okinawan surnames. One of the names, 大城, means "big castle".

People with the name include:
 (born 1973), Okinawan singer-songwriter and actor
Kaz Oshiro (born 1967), Okinawa born artist based in Los Angeles
Kūron Oshiro (尾城 九龍, born 1961) Japanese musical composer and arranger 
Matsumi Ōshiro (大城 松美, fl. 1980–1990), Japanese voice actress born in Tokyo
Misaki Oshiro (born 1984), Okinawan weightlifter.
Miwa Oshiro (大城 美和, born 1983), Japanese gravure idol, model and actress born to Okinawan father 
Nick Oshiro (born 1978), Japanese-American musician, drummer of the industrial metal band Static-X
Tatsuhiro Oshiro (大城 立裕, born 1925), Okinawan novelist and playwright
Toshihiro Oshiro, Okinawan martial artist
Vanesa Oshiro (born 1981), Nikkei enka singer born in Argentina
Yuto Oshiro (大城 佑斗, born 1996), Japanese footballer for Nagano Parceiro

See also
 

Japanese-language surnames